The New York, Texas and Mexican Railway Company was a railroad business chartered in 1880 to connect New York City with Mexico City with the initial tracks laid in Texas. It was established by Joseph Telfener, an Italian engineer and financier.

The company issued stock and sought land grants but violated an agreement on its starting point. State law was subsequently changed to eliminate land grants to railroad and canal builders and the railroad passed to Telfener's brother-in-law. In 1890 it was merged with another railroad.

John W. Mackay helped finance the project. He and Telfener named its first six stations after themselves and their family members. A historical marker commemorates the line in Hungerford, Texas.

References

Rail transportation in Mexico City
Rail transportation in Mexico
Rail transportation in New York City
Rail transportation in the United States
1880s in rail transport